Endless Shrimp may refer to:

 Endless Shrimp, an annual promotion at the American casual dining restaurant chain Red Lobster
 "Endless Shrimp, Endless Night", a season 2 episode of The New Adventures of Old Christine